The following squads were named for the 1935 South American Championship that took place in Peru.

Argentina
 Fernando Bello
 Sebastián Gualco
 Rodolfo De Jonge
 Antonio De Mare
 Arturo Scarcella
 Carlos Wilson
 Roberto Sbarra
 Arturo Arrieta
 Diego García
 Michel Lauri
 Herminio Masantonio
 José María Minella
 Antonio Sastre
 Vicente Zito

Chile
 Isaías Azerman
 Roberto Cortés
 Ascanio Cortés
 Guillermo Gornall
 Guillermo Riveros
 Quintín Vargas
 Conrado Welsh
 Carlos Aranda
 Enrique Araneda
 Arturo Torres Carrasco
 José Avendaño
 Moisés Avilés
 Arturo Carmona
 Carlos Giudice
 Eduardo Schneeberger
 Enrique Sorrel
 Carlos Vidal

Peru
 Jorge Alcalde
 Vicente Arce
 Mario de las Casas
 Alberto Denegri
 Arturo Fernández
 Teodoro Fernández
 Domingo García
 Eulogio García
 Jorge Góngora
 José María Lavalle
 Narciso León
 Alberto Montellanos
 José Morales
 Lizandro Nue
 Lorenzo Pacheco
 Juan Rivero
 Carlos Tovar
 Juan Humberto Valdivieso
 Alejandro Villanueva

Uruguay
 Enrique Ballestrero
 Luis Denis
 Agenor Muñiz
 José Nasazzi
 Erebo Zunino
 Braulio Castro
 Lorenzo Fernandez
 Marcelino Pérez
 Hector Castro
 Aníbal Ciocca
 Enrique Fernández
 Alberto Taboada

References

Squads
Copa América squads